Heinberg is a surname. Notable people with the surname include:

 Allan Heinberg (born 1967), American writer
 Richard Heinberg, American journalist

See also
 Weinberg (surname)